Wijtze Gerrit Carel (Wim) Schuhmacher or Schumacher (28 Feb 1894, Amsterdam - 5 June 1986, Amsterdam) was a Dutch painter and designer. He is mostly associated with Magic realism.

His nickname is "The Master of Grey" because of the grey haze that seems to cover his later work. Towards the end of his life, he became considerably less productive due to increasingly worse eyesight.

Sources
Wim Schuhmacher at the Netherlands Institute for Art History

1894 births
1986 deaths
Painters from Amsterdam
20th-century Dutch painters
Dutch male painters
20th-century Dutch male artists